is a Japanese anime OVA series produced and animated by AIC and Artmic and released in Japan in 1987. Dangaioh featured character designs by creator Toshiki Hirano, mechanical designs by Shoji Kawamori, and animation direction by Masami Ōbari.

Plot
Brought together by the mysterious Dr. Tarsan, four powerful psychic warriors Mia Alice, Lamba Nom, Pai Thunder, and Roll Kran can unite four powerful planes to form Dangaioh—the most powerful weapon in the universe. Using their combined psionic force, the Dangaioh team alone can stop the bloody tyranny of Captain Galimos and Gil Berg.

The team hopes their psychogenic wave will be strong enough to destroy Galimos's evil henchman, the notorious Gil Berg, who has sworn by the taking of his right eye to utterly destroy the Dangaioh Team. Along with the threat of Gil Berg, the Dangaioh Team must also avoid falling foul of Galimos's trickery, which finds weakness in their forgotten pasts.

Characters

Main characters

A young girl who possesses telekinesis, but is reluctant to use violence during combat. Nevertheless, her powers activate instinctively when she or her teammates face imminent death. Mia is originally from Earth, but unlike her teammates, she has no complete recollection of her memory. Because of this, she decides to stay with the Dangaioh team instead of returning to Earth when she has the chance. Mia pilots  No. 1, which forms Dangaioh's head and back.

A naive boy who has the ability to generate kinetic energy while running. The war had taken its toll on the resistance, which resulted in his comrades Burst and Flash betray him and leave him for dead before Dr. Tarsan added him to the Dangaioh project. He pilots Dan-Mechanic No. 2, which forms Dangaioh's torso, and is Dangaioh's main controller.

A childish girl who can fire laser blasts from her fingers. Lamba was a princess of the planet , but she fled before the Bunker destroyed her home planet. She pilots Dan-Mechanic No. 3, which forms Dangaioh's arms.

A tough-as-nails girl with superhuman strength. Upon recovering her memories, Pai reveals herself to be , daughter of the Bunker's Captain Galimos, but she renounces her birthright to side with the Dangaioh team. She pilots Dan-Mechanic No. 4, which forms Dangaioh's legs.

Creator of Dangaioh. Dr. Tarsan reconditions the memories of Mia, Roll, Lamba, and Pai to become ESPers and initially intends to sell them and Dangaioh to Captain Galimos, but after the quartet escape, he has a sudden change of heart and supports them in their war against the Bunker Space Pirates.

Antagonists

A cyborg and former assistant of Dr. Tarsan. Gil despises Mia's calm and gentle demeanor and hates the Dangaioh team for being chosen instead of him to be sold to the Bunker Space Pirates. After Dr. Tarsan betrays Captain Galimos, Gil displays his loyalty to the Bunker by removing his own left eye, destroying the last of his humanity. He invades Earth and wreaks havoc on Tokyo with his / mecha, but is killed by Dangaioh. Following the defeat of Burst and Flash, Gil uses his new mecha  to severely damage Dangaioh, but Dangaioh uses the last of its energy to destroy Gil Gear before disappearing. Despite his loss and the death of Commander Dartilla, Gil is promoted as one of Captain Galimos's generals.

Captain Galimos has used his power to conquer various star systems.

Captain Galimos's four generals. While the generals disapprove of Captain Galimos' support of Gil Berg, Dartilla takes the cyborg under his wing. Dartilla is killed when Dangaioh destroys the Bunker's base on planet Latecia.

Dr. Tarsan's two other creations, Yoldo is a cyborg while Deela is an android. When the Dangaioh team escapes from Dr. Tarsan's ship, Yoldo and Deela are assigned to capture them. They intercept the quartet on a desert planet, but Yoldo is killed by Pai. Deela's ship is destroyed when Mia deflects a hyper-napalm bomb with her telekinesis, but she tells them Dr. Tarsan's original motives for them before she deactivates from her injuries.

Lamba's former servant in Lilith. Following the destruction of Lilith, Shazarla joins the Bunker, feeling that the Nom family betrayed her people. She leads a trio of assassins and controls the mecha  on a mission to destroy Dangaioh. Her thirst for vengeance, however, is overpowered by Lamba's will to fight for her lost people. Upon discovering that Dangaioh's Psychic Wave hands bear the symbol of the Nom family, Shazarla concedes and allows herself and her subordinates to be killed by Lamba's Spiral Knuckle attack.

Shazarla's subordinates. Domdon has the ability to manipulate gravity while Oscar possesses superhuman strength equal to that of Pai.

Former members of the resistance group on Latecia. Frustrated by the belief that they are fighting a losing war, Burst and Flash betray Roll and leave him for dead to join the Bunker.

Supporting characters

Members of the Latecia resistance group who took leadership after Roll's disappearance. They blame Roll for the loss of morale in the resistance, as well as the apparent deaths of Burst and Flash. Kilkel and Folk are murdered by Burst and Flash as part of a plot to capture Roll in the Bunker's base.

Episodes

Music
The OVA's score was composed by Chumei Watanabe. The soundtrack was released by Nippon Columbia on August 21, 1987.

Opening theme
"Cross Fight!" (eps. 1-2)
Lyrics: Akira Ōtsu
Music: Chumei Watanabe
Vocals: Mitsuko Horie and Ichirou Mizuki

"Cheap Thrills" (ep. 3)
Lyrics: Takeshi Sakakibara
Music: Tatsuyuki Ōhara
Vocals: Hidemi Nakai

Ending theme
 (eps. 1-2)
Lyrics: Akira Ōtsu
Music: Chumei Watanabe
Vocals: Mitsuko Horie

"Who's Gonna Win?" (ep. 3)
Lyrics: Takeshi Sakakibara
Music: Tatsuyuki Ōhara
Vocals: Hidemi Nakai

Release
Episode 1 of Dangaioh was first released in North America on subtitled VHS format by U.S. Renditions in 1990 as Dangaio. It was infamously known for a subtitling error towards the end of the episode. Dangaioh's final attacks "Psychic Wave" and "Psychic Sword" were misspelled as "Side-kick Wave" and "Side-kick Sword." Episodes 2 and 3 were released in 1992 with a different translation staff behind the subtitling production.

Following the demise of U.S. Renditions in the mid-1990s, Manga Entertainment re-released Dangaioh in 1996 as Dangaioh: Hyper Combat Unit, which was an English-dubbed compilation of episodes 2–3. Episode 1 was omitted from this release, as episode 2 begins with a summary of the episode. This version was released on DVD in 2003.

In Japan, Dangaioh was released on DVD by Bandai Visual on January 25, 2002. It was reissued on September 24, 2010 as part of the "Emotion the Best" DVD line. Dangaioh was released on Blu-ray by King Records on April 27, 2016.

Merchandise 
Kaiyodo released Dangaioh in the Revoltech action figure line in 2007. Studio Half Eye released a fully transformable Dangaioh model kit in 2014; it was then released as a completed toy in 2021. In May 2021, Good Smile Company released a model kit of Dangaioh as part of the Moderoid line.

Sequel

A new 13-episode series named Great Dangaioh ran from April 5, 2001 through July 5, 2001 on TV Asahi in Japan. The series was created and directed by Hirano, and produced by AIC. Hirano's wife, Narumi Kakinouchi, was the animation director. Originally perceived as a completely different story, the series was revealed halfway as the sequel to the OVA series.

The series was licensed in North America by Viz Media, featuring an English dub produced in the Philippines by Telesuccess Productions.

Video games
An Dangaioh adventure game was released for the PC-8801 in Japan in April 1990. Dangaioh's characters, mecha, and storyline elements appeared in Banpresto's Super Robot Wars games. They initially appeared in Super Robot Wars Compact 2 (Parts 1, 2, and 3) for the WonderSwan game system, and later in its PlayStation 2 remake, Super Robot Wars Impact, as well as the Nintendo DS game, Super Robot Wars K. Impact notably features voice acting from the original Japanese voice actors.

The Nintendo 64 and Dreamcast video game Bangai-O contains various references to the series.

Notes

References

External links
  (archived) 
 
 

1987 anime OVAs
1980s toys
1990 video games
Adventure anime and manga
Anime International Company
NEC PC-8801 games
Films with screenplays by Shō Aikawa
Super robot anime and manga